Pectis linifolia, the romero macho, is a summer blooming annual plant in the genus Pectis. It is widespread throughout Mexico, Central America, South America and the West Indies. In the mainland United States, it has been reported only from Arizona and Florida.

References

linifolia
Plants described in 1759
Flora of South America
Flora of Central America
Flora of the Caribbean
Flora of Mexico
Flora of Florida
Flora of Arizona
Taxa named by Carl Linnaeus
Flora without expected TNC conservation status